The 1942 United States Senate election in Oklahoma took place on November 3, 1942. Incumbent Democratic Senator Joshua B. Lee ran for re-election to a second consecutive term. After winning the Democratic primary against several strong opponents, Lee advanced to the general election, where he was originally set to face former Republican Senator William B. Pine. However, shortly after winning the Republican primary, Pine died; the state Republican Party tapped businessman Edward H. Moore as its replacement nominee. In a favorable Republican environment, Moore defeated Lee by a wide margin to win his first and only term in the U.S. Senate.

Democratic primary

Candidates
 Joshua B. Lee, incumbent U.S. Senator
 Orel Busby, former Justice on the Oklahoma Supreme Court
 William H. Murray, former Governor of Oklahoma
 Wilbur Wright
 Dan Nelson
 Paul V. Beck
 Mark Long
 George H. Brasler
 Lilly Allen Lasley
 Clay Woodrow England

Results

Republican primary

Candidates
 William B. Pine, former U.S. Senator
 S. M. Stauffer
 Frank A. Anderson

Results

After he won the Republican primary, William B. Pine died, leaving a vacancy on the Republican ticket. The Republican Party selected wealthy businessman Edward H. Moore as its replacement nominee.

General election

Results

References

Oklahoma
1942
1942 Oklahoma elections